The Rivière Noire (English: Black River) is a tributary of the east bank of the Montmorency River. It flows in the unorganized territory of Lac-Jacques-Cartier, in the La Côte-de-Beaupré Regional County Municipality, in the administrative region of Capitale-Nationale, in the province of Quebec, in Canada.

This valley is mainly served by a forest road R0303 which comes from the south by passing on the west side of the mount Robert-Bellefeuille, then by crossing the Black river and going up towards the north by the East side of its course. Approaching the marsh area located west of the southern part of lac des Neiges, the road makes a detour to the east to bypass this latter lake from the south and continue north on the east bank.

Because of its altitude, the surface of the upper Black River is generally frozen from late November to early April; however, safe circulation on the ice is generally done from mid-December to the end of March. The lower part of the river course has a freezing period of about a week less than the upper part. The water level of the river varies with the seasons and the precipitation; the spring flood occurs in March or April.

Geography 
The Black River has its source in Lake Asticot, in the Laurentides Wildlife Reserve, in the territory not organized by Lac-Jacques-Cartier.

Upper Black River (segment of )

  first towards the south crossing Lac des Rainettes until its mouth;
  southwards crossing Lac des Loirs, to the outlet (coming from the southwest) of Lake Roza;
  towards the south-east by crossing a marsh zone until a bend of the river which forms a loop towards the east, then towards the south-west by starting in the marsh zone on  where the course forms a few small loops and a hook towards the west, up to a bend in the river;
  towards the south in particular by crossing Lake Bernier, up to its mouth;

Lower Black River (segment of )

  to the south by collecting a stream (coming from the west), crossing a marsh area and crossing Lac Noir, to its mouth;
  towards the south-east by collecting the discharge (coming from the north-west) from Lake Belle Fontaine and by cutting the forest road R0308, going down in a well-steep valley, to a stream (coming from the north);
  to the south in an increasingly deep valley, relatively in a straight line while forming a few small eighth notes, to its mouth.

The last  of the course of the Noire River cross the Montmorency Forest. From the confluence of the Black River, the current flows over  generally south along the course of the Montmorency River, to the northwest bank of the St. Lawrence River.

Toponymy 
The Black River toponym was formalized on June 1, 1972 at the Commission de toponymie du Québec.

See also 

 La Côte-de-Beaupré Regional County Municipality
 Laurentides Wildlife Reserve
 Montmorency River
 Montmorency Forest, a protected area
 List of rivers of Quebec

Notes and references

Sources 
 

Rivers of Capitale-Nationale
La Côte-de-Beaupré Regional County Municipality
Laurentides Wildlife Reserve